Gary or Garry Bennett may refer to:
Gary Bennett (baseball) (born 1972), American Major League Baseball catcher
Gary Bennett (cricketer) (born 1971), former English cricketer
Gary Bennett (educator) Bishop-MacDermott Family Professor of Psychology & Neuroscience, Global Health and Medicine at Duke University
Gary Bennett (footballer, born 1961), English footballer, ex-Sunderland
Gary Bennett (footballer, born 1963), English footballer, of Chester City and Wrexham
Gary Bennett (footballer, born 1970), English footballer, ex-Colchester United
Gary Bennett (politician), former mayor of Kingston, Ontario (1994–2000) and Progressive Conservative candidate in the 2018 Ontario general election
Gary Bennett (referee), Australian rugby league referee
Gary L. Bennett (born 1940), American scientist and science fiction writer
Garry Knox Bennett (born 1934), American woodworker, furniture maker and sculptor

See also
Gareth Bennett (disambiguation)